Bernhard Schilter (born 23 January 1922) was a Swiss bobsledder who competed in the late 1940s. He finished eighth in the four-man event at the 1948 Winter Olympics in St. Moritz.

References
1948 bobsleigh four-man results
Bernhard Schilter's profile at Sports Reference.com

External links
  

1922 births
Bobsledders at the 1948 Winter Olympics
Possibly living people
Swiss male bobsledders